Hotelier usually refers to a hotel manager.

Hotelier may also refer to:
 Hotelier (South Korean TV series), a South Korean TV drama broadcast in 2001 in 20 episodes
 Hotelier (Japanese TV series), a Japanese TV drama broadcast in 2007 in 9 episodes
 The Hotelier, an American rock band

See also
 :Category:Hoteliers
 Hotel (disambiguation)